Emmanuelia is a genus of lichen-forming fungi in the subfamily Lobarioideae of the family Peltigeraceae. It has 12 species. It was circumscribed in 2020 by Antoine Simon, Robert Lücking, and Bernard Goffinet. They assigned Emmanuelia ravenelii as the type species, reasoning "this is probably the best-documented species of the lineage and its identification is straightforward". The genus name honours Belgian lichenologist Emmanuël Sérusiaux, "for his extensive contributions to advancing our understanding of the diversification of the Peltigerales".

Molecular phylogenetic analyses show that the genus forms a monophyletic group that has a sister taxon relationship with the lineage containing the genera Dendriscosticta, Lobariella, and Yoshimuriella. Using time-calibrated phylogeny, Emmanuelia is estimated to have emerged about 10 million years ago in the late Miocene, and as such, is one of the younger genera in the Lobarioideae.

Species
The following list gives the species of Emmanuelia followed by their author citation (the original describer of the species is in parentheses), year transferred into Emmanuelia, and country where the type was collected.
Emmanuelia americana  – Brazil
Emmanuelia conformis  – Mexico
Emmanuelia cuprea  – Paraguay
Emmanuelia elaeodes  – Brazil
Emmanuelia erosa  – Brazil
Emmanuelia excisa  – Colombia
Emmanuelia lobulifera  – Florida, USA
Emmanuelia ornata  – Brazil
Emmanuelia patinifera  – Brazil
Emmanuelia pseudolivacea  – Brazil
Emmanuelia ravenelii  – South Carolina, USA
Emmanuelia tenuis  – Brazil

References

Peltigerales
Peltigerales genera
Lichen genera
Taxa described in 2020
Taxa named by Robert Lücking